Valley Stream is a train station located in Valley Stream. It is on the Atlantic Branch of the Long Island Rail Road. 

Valley Stream is the westernmost station on the Atlantic Branch in Nassau County. The station is located at Franklin Avenue and Sunrise Highway, west of Rockaway Avenue. It is wheelchair-accessible with an elevator from street level; parking facilities and taxis are available.

Valley Stream is served by Far Rockaway Branch and Long Beach Branch as of February 27, 2023. West Hempstead Branch trains previously stopped at this station. The tracks of the Montauk Branch pass through the station north of the Atlantic Branch tracks. Directly east of the station, the Atlantic Branch splits into the Long Beach Branch, which continues east to Lynbrook and Long Beach, and the Far Rockaway Branch, which turns south toward Far Rockaway. Also, the West Hempstead Branch diverges north of the Montauk Branch.

History
The first Valley Stream station was built by the South Side Railroad of Long Island on October 28, 1867. The station house itself opened in July 1869 with the opening of the Far Rockaway Branch, and was built as a Swiss chalet style station house inside the legs of an old wye. It also served customers of the Southern Hempstead Branch which was built by the short-lived New York and Hempstead Plains Railroad between 1871 and 1900. Along with the rest of the SSRRLI, the station was acquired by the Long Island Rail Road in 1889. In 1893 the station began to serve trains along the West Hempstead Branch. When Nassau County separated from Queens in 1899, Valley Stream station became the first station in Nassau County along the Montauk Branch. The station was electrified with the rest of the Far Rockaway Branch on December 11, 1905, and the Long Beach Branch was extended from Lynbrook station in 1910 and became an extension of the Atlantic Branch.

In 1933, the original station was razed as part of a grade crossing elimination project along the Montauk, Atlantic, and Babylon branches. Prior to this, a temporary station was relocated on a shoo-fly north of the former station on August 10, 1932, then moved to another one south of the former station on August 31 of the same year. The third elevated center-island structure that exists today was opened north of the former location on February 7, 1933, and although the wye was removed as part of the reconstruction, it remained on many maps well into the late-20th Century, and continues to be shown on some in the present.

Clear Stream station
Shortly after electrical service of the Far Rockaway Branch was established, the LIRR created a new station west of Valley Stream at Clear Stream Road (now Avenue) called Clear Stream. It opened in 1906 and used only for rush hour service. The station was eliminated after 1910.

Station layout
An eight-car-long island platform is located between the two Atlantic Branch tracks, 1 and 2. The two bypass tracks located to the north are part of the Montauk Branch.

References

External links

Arrt's Arrchives
Maps from 1873 and 1910
 Hicks Street entrance from Google Maps Street View
 Franklin Avenue entrance from Google Maps Street View
 Platform from Google Maps Street View

Valley Stream, New York
Long Island Rail Road stations in Nassau County, New York
Railway stations in the United States opened in 1869